The Forest fire weather index (FWI) (French: indice forêt météo, IFM) is an estimation of the risk of wildfire computed by Météo France and the Meteorological Service of Canada. It was introduced in France in 1992 but is based on a Canadian empirical model developed and widely used since 1976.

Description 
The index is a whole number that ranges between 0 and 20 in France and up to above 30 in Canada. It is computed from five components. The first three components are numeric ratings of the moisture content of litter and other fine fuels, the average moisture content of loosely compacted organic layers of moderate depth, and the average moisture content of deep, compact organic layers. The last two components are the rate of fire spread if fuel is available for combustion, and the frontal fire intensity.

The essential information needed to calculate this index is:
 the humidity of the air at the beginning of the afternoon (when it has its lowest value);
 the temperature in the middle of the afternoon (when it has its highest value);
 the 24-hour total precipitation (from noon to noon);
 the maximum speed of the average wind.

Usages

Australia 
The FWI was adapted for use in Australia, with large FWI values most commonly associated with high wind speeds, followed secondly by low relative humidities and then thirdly by high temperatures.

France 
This index is computed for 40 zones of France, three are in the Landes (département with the biggest forest of France). Météo France sends the IFM to civil defense authorities, which allows the prepositioning of men and vehicles, especially air units. The computed index is revised every year to take new data into account.

Canada 
Each provincial forest fire prevention authority is calculating the FWI for the different regions under their jurisdiction. The Daily Severity Rating (DSR) is a numeric rating of the difficulty of controlling fires, based on the Fire Weather Index, that is calculated afterward. It reflects more accurately the expected efforts required for fire suppression.

New Caledonia 
A daily fire weather outlook is issued twice a day to alert the fire authority and help local firefighters to get organized. Provided information is based on FWI values computed at 20 weather stations representative of the climatic diversity of the country.

Croatia 
FWI has been adopted in 1980s at Meteorological and Hydrological Service of Croatia where it is computed daily and used as a predictor in forest fire risk assessment. Final product is calibrated and ranked in 5 risk classes, from very low to very high. Product is daily forwarded to civil defense authorities.

See also
 National Fire Danger Rating System
 Haines Index

References

Bibliography 
Stocks, B.J., B.D. Lawson, M.E. Alexander, M.E., C.E. Van Wagner, R.S. McAlpine, T.J. Lynham, D.E. Dube. 1989. The Canadian Forest Fire Danger Rating System: An Overview. Forestry Chronicle Vol. 65 issue 6 : 450-457.

Wildfire suppression
Firefighting
Forestry and the environment
Atmospheric dynamics
Hazard scales
Meteorological indices